Enckhausen is the family name of the following persons

 Heinrich Enckhausen (1799–1885), German organist, composer and singing teacher^
 Johannes Enckhausen (died 1699), German clergyman and superintendent in Ebstorf
 Johannes Enckhausen (1676–1758), German clergyman and superintendent in Sulingen und Sievershausen
 Malwine Enckhausen (1843–1932), pseudonym: I. Herzog, German author

German-language surnames